And If Our God Is For Us... is the sixth studio album by American singer-songwriter Chris Tomlin, released on November 16, 2010, through Sixstepsrecords It is also available as a CD/DVD Limited Edition featuring four acoustic tracks and a Behind the Scenes video.  The album won the Best Contemporary Christian Music Album at 54th Grammy Awards, and the Worship Album of the Year at the 43rd Dove Awards.

Track listing 

DVD:

 Behind the Scenes at White Cabin Studio
 "I Will Rise"
 "Love"

Personnel 
 Chris Tomlin – vocals, acoustic guitars
 Matt Gilder – acoustic piano, keyboards, programming
 Daniel Carson – electric guitars, acoustic guitars
 Jesse Reeves – bass
 Travis Nunn – drums, percussion 

Additional musicians
 Ed Cash – programming, electric guitars, acoustic guitars, backing vocals
 Scott Cash – keyboards, programming, acoustic guitars, backing vocals
 Dan Muckala – keyboards, programming
 Chuck Butler – guitars
 David Davidson – strings (1)
 Luke Brown – backing vocals
 Christy Nockels – backing vocals, lead vocals (9, 15)

Singers
 Daniel Carson, Ed Cash, Scott Cash, Louie Giglio, Shelley Giglio, Matt Gilder, Christy Nockels, Nathan Nockels, Travis Nunn, Brad O'Donnell, John Pritchard, Janet Reeves, Jesse Reeves and Chris Tomlin.

Production 
 Louie Giglio – executive producer
 Shelley Giglio – executive producer, art direction, management 
 Brad O'Donnell – executive producer
 Mark Endert – mixing (1–5)
 Doug Johnson – mix assistant (1–5)
 F. Reid Shippen – mixing (6-11)
 Erik "Keller" Jahner – mix assistant (6-11)
 Ted Jensen  – mastering
 Jess Chambers – A&R administration
 Leighton Ching – art direction
 Jan Cook – art direction
 Jesse Owen – design
 Lee Steffen – photography
 Daley Hake – live photography
 Mike McCloskey – management

Tracks 1, 5 & 7-11 
 Ed Cash – producer, engineer 
 Jim Dineen – engineer
 Scott Cash – assistant engineer 
 Cody Norris – assistant engineer

Tracks 2, 3, 4 & 6 
 Dan Muckala – producer, engineer 
 Dan Deurloo – assistant engineer, additional editing 
 Chuck Butler – additional editing

Acoustic Bonus Songs 
 Nathan Nockels – producer 
 Jim Dineen – engineer
 Ainslie Grosser – mixing 
 Andrew Mendleson – mastering 

Studios
 White Cabin Studio (Atlanta, Georgia) – recording location
 Glomo Studios (Nashville, Tennessee) – recording location (2-4, 6)
 Ed's (Franklin, Tennessee) – overdub recording location (1, 5, 7-11)
 Indian River Studios (Merritt Island, Florida) – mixing location (1–5)
 Robot Lemon (Nashville, Tennessee) – mixing location (6-11)
 Sterling Sound (New York City, New York) – mastering location
 Georgetown Masters (Nashville, Tennessee) – mastering location (acoustic bonus songs on deluxe edition)

Singles 

 "Our God" (2010)
 "I Will Follow" (2010)
 "I Lift My Hands" (2011)

Charts

Weekly charts

Year-end charts

References 

2010 albums
Chris Tomlin albums
Grammy Award for Best Contemporary Christian Music Album